Galatasaray Sailing Team is the men's and women's sailing section of Galatasaray S.K., a major sports club in Istanbul, Turkey. There are optimist, finn, Laser Radial, Laser Standard, Mistral, Laser M  and windsurf teams. In 2011, Galatasaray Windsurf Team won Turkish Windsurfing Championship Cup.

Technical staff

Honours

Optimist Class
2000 International GAP Cup Winner
2011 Naval Cup Runners-up, Haluk Çalın
2011 44.Balkan Championship (2.)Haluk Çalın
2012 Turkish Championship,(2.) Haluk Çalın

Finn Class
1969 Turkish Championship Winner-İstanbul Championship Winner
1970 Turkish Championship Winner-İstanbul Championship Winner
1971 Turkish Championship Winner-İstanbul Championship Winner
1972 Turkish Championship Winner-İstanbul Championship Winner
1973 Turkish Championship Winner-İstanbul Championship Winner
1974 Turkish Championship Winner-İstanbul Championship Winner
1975 Turkish Championship Winner-İstanbul Championship Winner
1998 Turkish Championship Winner
1999 İstanbul Championship Runners-Up
2001 İstanbul Championship Winner
2001 Turkish Championship (3.)
2001 İstanbul Championship (3.)
2002 İstanbul Championship (3.

420 Class 
 2014 Turkish Championship (2.) Haluk Çalın & Alp Güçer
 2015 Turkish Championship (2.) Haluk Çalın & Alp Güçer

Laser Radial Class
1998 İstanbul Championship Runners-Up
1998 Marmara Group Championship Winner
1998 Turkish Championship Winner
1998 Balkan Championship Runners-Up
1998 Balkan Championship Runners-Up
1998 European Cup 1. Elimination Winner
1998 European Cup 3. Elimination Winner
1998 European Cup 4. Elimination Winner
1998 European Cup 5. Elimination Winner
1998 European Championship Total Winner
1998 Naval Academy Cup Winner
1999 İstanbul Championship Winner
1999 Marmara Group Championship Winner
1999 Turkish Championship Winner
1999 Avrupa Şampiyonası Birincisi
2000 İstanbul Championship Winner
2000 European Championship Winner
2001 İstanbul Championship (3.)
2001 Turkish Championship Winner
2001 WorldCup Championship (4.)
2011 Naval Cup Runners-up, Mustafa Onur Durak

Laser Standard Class
1999 İstanbul Championship Winner
1999 Marmara Group Championship Winner
1999 Turkish Championship Winner
2001 Turkish Championship Runners-Up
2001 Federation Cup Winner

Mistral Olympic Class
1998 Marmara Group Championship Winner
1998 Balkan Championship Runners-Up
1998 Turkish Championship Winner
1998 Turkish Championship (3.)
1998 İstanbul Championship Runners-Up
1998 Balkan Championship (Youth) (3.)
1999 Balkan Championship Winner
1999 Turkish Championship Winner
2000 İstanbul Championship Winner
2000 Turkish Championship Winner
2000 2000 Olympics (31.)
2000 Turkish Youth Championship Winner
2000 Turkish Youth Championship Runners-Up
2000 İstanbul Youth Championship Winner
2000 İstanbul Youth Championship Runners-Up
2001 İstanbul Championship Winner
2001 Turkish Championship Winner
2001 Mediterranean Cup (4.)
2001 İstanbul Championship (3.)
2001 Turkish Championship (3.)
2001 İstanbul Youth Championship Winner
2001 Turkish Youth Championship Winner
2002 Turkish Championship Runners-Up
2002 Turkish Championship Winner

1 M Class
2000 İstanbul Championship Runners-Up
2000 Turkish Championship Runners-Up
2001 İstanbul Championship Runners-Up
2001 Turkish Championship Runners-Up
2001 İstanbul Championship (3.)
2001 Turkish Championship Winner

Windsurf 
2003 Turkish Championship Winner
2011 Turkish Championship Winner

Windsurf RSX
2011 Naval Cup Winner, Simla Çilingiroğlu
2011 Naval Cup Runners-up, Pamir Saçkan

Windsurf Techno293 U17
2011 Naval Cup Winner, Seben Göle
2011 Naval Cup Runners-up, Simay Bengü

Windsurf Techno293 U15
2011 Naval Cup Winner, Cavit Onur Biriz

Pirat Class
2011 Turkish Championship Winner, Çağlan Kuruner & Caner Erdem
2012 Turkish Championship Winner, Çağlan Kuruner & Caner Erdem

References

External links
Galatasaray SK Official Web Site 
Galatasaray SK Sailing Official Web Site   \

Galatasaray Sailing
Sport in Istanbul
1910 establishments in the Ottoman Empire